Francesco de Leo, Ph.D. is an Italian seasoned executive and one of the world's renown thought leaders in the field of Information and Communications Technology with a particular focus on issues relating to Green ICT.  One of the Young Global Leaders at the World Economic Forum of 1999, he is the Founder and Executive Chairman of Kaufmann & Partners (K&P), a London-based advisory company focused on telco, media, and corporate finance. In his role as Chairman of K&P Francesco played a key role in supporting Cellnex Telecom in the acquisition of WIND’s tower business, a transaction valued at 690 Million Euros for a portfolio of 7,737 towers.

De Leo is co-founder and partner of Kaufmann Marczyk Capital Partners (KMCP), advising financial institutions in the field of asset management and portfolio selection. KMCP provides indices for assessing the sustainability of portfolios, funds, corporations and markets. The principal focus is on mitigating unexpected risks that are affecting asset allocation and portfolio management at large/diversified financial institutions. KMCP together with Media Tenor is working with the Managing Director of the United Nations HQs in Geneva, Michael Moller, at launch of the Global Sustainability Index (GSI), backed by the Chairman of Deutsche Borse, Dr. Joachim Faber.

Prof. De Leo is also acting as President of European Operations for Prodea Systems, a Dallas-based company leading in the field of the “Internet of Things”. He is the Founder and the Executive Chairman of Green Comm Challenge, which focuses on investments in green technology in the US and Europe and a Professor of Corporate Strategy at LUISS Guido Carli University in Rome.
 
He is currently serving as a member of the following Advisory Boards: 
 GEO Capital, a leading investment bank with offices in Macao and Lisbon, founded by Jorge Ferro Ribeiro.
 Capgemini 
 Telco, Media & Entertainment Advisory Board in London. 
 Simtone, one of the leading providers of cloud computing solutions

Past Experience
 From January 2010 through July 2012 Francesco De Leo was a member of the Board of Directors of SIRTI, the Italian leading company in the field of telecom network rollout and management.
 From July 2005 through December 2008, Francesco De Leo served as Director for Business Development and International Affairs at Wind (Italy), the third largest mobile carrier and second largest fixed line telecom operator in Italy. He subsequently served as Chief Strategy Officer and Head for Business Development and Corporate Communications for Wind.
 In January 2007 he was appointed Vice-Chairman of Tellas in Athens, Greece, the second largest fixed line operator in the country, where he merged the company with Wind Hellas, at the end of 2008.
 Before joining Wind, Francesco De Leo served as an Executive Director at IFIL-Exor, the financial holding company controlled by the Agnelli family which owns among others FIAT Group, Worms, Cushman & Wakefield, and Juventus.
 He was appointed Managing Director of Telecom Italia after its privatization,  where he was in charge of R&D, M&A, International Operations and Strategy, and served as Chairman of STET International, and Stream (the digital TV platform of Telecom Italia). He was on the Board of Directors of TIM (Telecom Italia Mobile) and Finsiel. In this role, he fostered the international expansion of Telecom Italia, through the acquisition of the third mobile license in Spain, the acquisition of Brasil Telecom and of 25% of Telekom Austria.
 He was Director at Graviton (La Jolla, California) from 2001 through 2004, a leading company in the field of wireless sensory networks, which in 2002 was selected by Fortune as one of the “Cool Companies”.

Education 
Francesco De Leo received a BA in Economics from Bocconi University in Milan, and
a Ph.D. in Strategy and Organization from UCLA Anderson School of Management. He is a graduate of CASD (Centro Alti Studi della Difesa).

References 

Living people
Italian business executives
Green Comm Racing sailors
Year of birth missing (living people)